Los Montesinos is a municipality located in the province of Alicante, Valencian Community, Spain.

References

Municipalities in the Province of Alicante
Vega Baja del Segura